Matthew Jones (September 17, 1936 – March 30, 2011) was an African-American folk singer/songwriter known for being a field secretary of the Student Nonviolent Coordinating Committee   and part of their The Freedom Singers in the 1960s.

Civil Rights Movement
Matthew Jones was a schooled, experienced musician, and became active in the Civil Rights Movement when he joined the Nashville Student Movement in 1960. Jones was an outspoken participant in the movement in Danville, Virginia, where he organized another vocal group, the Danville Freedom Voices, in 1963.

Jones relocated to Atlanta, Georgia, with his brother Marshall, who was also affiliated with the SNCC and their music ensemble, the Freedom Singers.

Matthew Jones faced down the Ku Klux Klan on many occasions and endured 29 arrests during the Civil Rights Movement. His experiences developed him into a "freedom singer" in the most literal manner.

"I don't think of myself as a cultural worker," Jones said. "I am a freedom singer; a freedom fighter. I've always been a freedom fighter; I'll probably go down that way, too. Freedom songs are different than other protest songs because they are really a mantra. The use of repetition allows for the message to be understood. If we sing a powerful statement enough times in a song, like 'This little light of mine, I'm gonna let it shine,' then we can internalize it".

Later life
Matthew Jones performed his repertoire around the world, including alongside terrorists in Northern Ireland.

During the Anti-Vietnam War movement he recorded a 45-rpm record, "Hell No, We Ain't Gonna Go" backed on the other side with "Super Sam."

At each performance, Jones included "The Freedom Chant," an affirmation he based on a famous quote by Fannie Lou Hamer and his own many years of direct action.

"I'm sick and tired 
of being sick and tired. 
I will not allow anybody 
at any time 
to violate my mind or my body 
in any shape, form or fashion. 
If they do, 
they'll have to deal with ME immediately! 
Freedom! Freedom! Freedom!"

After nearly a year of deteriorating health, Jones died in New York City on March 30, 2011.

Matt Jones recording
Matt Jones Then and Now, Relevant Records

SIDE A

   Freedom Road
   Uncle Tom's Prayer
   Freedom Medley
   Medgar Evers
   Legend of Danville
   Demonstrating G.I.
   Avon Rollins

 SIDE B

   Oginga Odinga
   Brother That Ain't Good
   It's Like A Wheel
   Nuclear Reactor
   Tree of Life

References

External links
 SNCC Digital Gateway: Matt Jones, Documentary website created by the SNCC Legacy Project and Duke University, telling the story of the Student Nonviolent Coordinating Committee & grassroots organizing from the inside-out

American folk singers
American activists
1936 births
2011 deaths
African-American activists
Student Nonviolent Coordinating Committee
21st-century African-American people